The Glen Campbell Goodtime Album is the 19th album by American singer/guitarist Glen Campbell, released in 1970.

Track listing

Side one
"It's Only Make Believe" (Conway Twitty, Jack Nance) – 2:18
"MacArthur Park" (Jimmy Webb) – 4:47
"As Far as I'm Concerned" (Bobby Russell) – 2:45
"Just Another Piece of Paper" (Jimmy Webb) – 2:09
"Pave Your Way into Tomorrow" (Billy Graham) – 1:36

Side two
"My Way" (Jacques Revaux, Claude François, Paul Anka) – 4:14
"Dream Sweet Dreams About Me" (John Ragsdale) – 2:37
"Bridge Over Troubled Water" (Paul Simon) – 3:20
"Turn It Around in Your Mind" (Jerry Reed) – 2:11
"Funny Kind of Monday" (Mitchell Torok, Ramona Redd) – 2:04

Personnel
Glen Campbell – vocals, acoustic guitar
Al Casey – acoustic guitar
Dennis Budimir – acoustic guitar
Billy Graham – bass guitar
Bob Felts – drums
Earl Palmer – drums
Gene Estes – percussion
Dennis McCarthy – piano

Production
Producer – Al De Lory
Arranged by Al De Lory, Marty Paich, Dennis McCarthy
Photography – Gordon Alexandre, Rick Rankin

Charts
Album – Billboard (United States)

Singles – Billboard (United States)

Glen Campbell albums
1970 albums
Albums arranged by Marty Paich
Capitol Records albums